Ophioglossolambis digitata is a species of sea snail, a marine gastropod mollusk in the family Strombidae, the true conchs.

Distribution
This species occurs in the Indian Ocean off Kenya, Madagascar, the Mascarene Basin, Mauritius, Mozambique, Réunion and Tanzania.

References

 Dautzenberg, Ph. (1929). Contribution à l'étude de la faune de Madagascar: Mollusca marina testacea. Faune des colonies françaises, III(fasc. 4). Société d'Editions géographiques, maritimes et coloniales: Paris. 321-636, plates IV-VII pp.
 Walls, J.G. (1980). Conchs, tibias and harps. A survey of the molluscan families Strombidae and Harpidae. T.F.H. Publications Ltd, Hong Kong. 
 Dekkers A.M. (2012) A new genus related to the genus Lambis Röding, 1798 (Gastropoda: Strombidae) from the Indian Ocean. Gloria Maris 51(2-3): 68-74. [8 April 2012; title page erroneously dated 11 March] [

Strombidae
Gastropods described in 1811